Basem Al-Shayeb is a researcher at the Innovative Genomics Institute. He was part of the discovery of the largest known bacteriophages, the smallest CRISPR gene editing systems, and Borgs in methane-oxidizing archaea. He was named Forbes 30 Under 30 and Arab America's 30 Under 30.

References 

Year of birth missing (living people)
Living people